The 23rd Street station was a local station on the demolished IRT Ninth Avenue Line in Manhattan, New York City. It had two levels. The lower level was built first and had two tracks and two side platforms. The upper level was built as part of the Dual Contracts and had one track that served express trains that bypassed the station.  It opened on October 21, 1873 and closed on June 11, 1940. The next southbound stop was 14th Street. The next northbound stop was 30th Street.

References

IRT Ninth Avenue Line stations
Railway stations in the United States opened in 1873
Railway stations closed in 1940
Former elevated and subway stations in Manhattan
1873 establishments in New York (state)
1940 disestablishments in New York (state)
23rd Street (Manhattan)